Linda Crockett (born in Hamilton, Ontario, Canada), is an American author and teacher, best known for her horror, romance, and psychological thrillers.  Linda Crockett published over a dozen books which were translated into as many languages, under the pen names Linda Crockett, Linda Crockett Gray, Linda C. Gray, and Christina Crockett.  First published by Playboy Paperbacks in 1979, Linda went on to write four Harlequin "Super-romances", making history by introducing the first disabled leading man ever to appear in a Harlequin romance novel.

Due to injuries from a car accident in 1990, Linda was unable to continue consistently writing until she recovered. She is currently a teacher of Critical Thinking in one of the oldest high schools in St. Petersburg, Florida.

Bibliography

Published under "Linda Crocket":
Carousel
Publisher: Tor Books; Reprint edition (May, 1995)

Sandman
Publisher: Tor Books (October, 1990)

Published under "Linda C. Gray":
Fortune's Fugitive
Publisher: Playboy Paperbacks (December 1, 1979)

Satyr
Publisher: Playboy Paperbacks (July 1, 1981)

Published under "Linda C. Gray":
Scryer
Publisher: Tom Doherty Assoc Llc (March, 1987)

Tangerine
Publisher: Tor Books (February, 1988)

Mama's Boy
Publisher: Onyx Books (August, 1989)

Siren 
Publisher: Tor Books; Reissue edition (January, 1989)
Reprint of original publication: Avon 1982

Dark Window
Publisher: New American Library (Mm) (March, 1991)

Safelight
Publisher: Signet Books (December, 1992)

Harlequin SuperRomances, published under "Christina Crockett":
To Touch a Dream
Publisher: Harlequin (February 1, 1983)

A Moment of Magic
Publisher: Harlequin (January 1, 1984)

Song of the Seabird
Publisher: Harlequin (December 1, 1984)

Windward Passage
Publisher: Harlequin (June 1, 1985)

See also
List of horror fiction authors

External links

20th-century American novelists
American horror novelists
American romantic fiction writers
Canadian emigrants to the United States
Novelists from Florida
Living people
Writers from Hamilton, Ontario
American thriller writers
Women horror writers
Women romantic fiction writers
American women novelists
20th-century American women writers
Women thriller writers
Year of birth missing (living people)
21st-century American women